El Jícaro could mean either of the following geographical locations:

El Jícaro, El Progreso, Guatemala
El Jícaro, Nueva Segovia, Nicaragua
El Jícaro, Veracruz, Mexico
El Jícaro, Texiguat, El Paraiso, Honduras. Its geographical coordinates are 13° 42' 19" North, 87° 0' 34" West.
El Jícaro (river), El Salvador